"Con Alma" is a jazz standard written by Dizzy Gillespie, appearing on his 1954 album Afro. The tune incorporates aspects of bebop jazz and Latin rhythm, and is known for its frequent changes in key centers (occurring every two bars), while still maintaining a singable melody.

Notable recordings
It has been noted that "As good as Dizzy's versions of his own tune are, it's probably not too crazy to say that 'Con Alma' really took off in the hands of other musicians." Among those who have recorded versions are:
 Sonny Rollins
 Sonny Stitt 
 Hal McKusick (Triple Exposure, 1957)
 Oscar Peterson (The Jazz Soul of Oscar Peterson, 1959; Swinging Brass with the Oscar Peterson Trio, 1959) 
 Roy Haynes (Just Us, 1960)
 The Jazztet (Big City Sounds, 1960)
 Ray Bryant (Con Alma, 1961)
 Wes Montgomery (Bumpin', 1965)
 Charles McPherson (Con Alma!, 1965)
 Ed Bickert
 Brian Bennett (Change of Direction, 1967)
 Stan Getz (Sweet Rain, 1967)
 Kenny Burrell (Ode to 52nd Street, 1967)
 Brother Jack McDuff (The Natural Thing, 1968)
 Randy Weston (African Cookbook, 1969)
 Lalo Schiffrin (Ins and Outs, 1985)
 Jesse van Ruller (Trio, 2001)
 George Shearing (Like Fine Wine, 2004)
 Cedar Walton (Underground Memoirs, 2005)
 Gerald Clayton (Two-Shade, 2009)
 Paquito D'Rivera (Panamericana Suite, 2010)
 Poncho Sanchez and Terence Blanchard (Chano y Dizzy!, 2011)
 Ulysses Owens, Jr. and Christian Sands (Unanimous, 2012)
 Abraham Mansfarroll (Dizzy el Afrocubano, 2021)
 Roy Hargrove and Mulgrew Miller on In Harmony (2006 recording released in 2021)

The song was recorded by Chaka Khan in 1982 as part of the "Be Bop Medley" from her album Chaka Khan.

References

External links
"Con Alma" at jazzstandards.com
"Con Alma" at AllMusic 
Dizzy Gillespie - Con Alma (1954)

1954 songs
Compositions by Dizzy Gillespie
Bebop jazz standards